The University of Notre Dame Fighting Irish and University of California, Los Angeles Bruins have a rivalry in men's basketball. They also play occasionally in football.

Series history
UCLA had a basketball rivalry with Notre Dame that started when Digger Phelps was the Notre Dame coach and John Wooden was the UCLA coach. UCLA and Notre Dame played a home-and-home meeting for several seasons in the 1970s and 1980s, which is otherwise uncommon outside conference play. In the late 1980s and early 1990s, the schools met once annually. This rivalry existed from the desire of the Notre Dame athletic department to schedule the top schools for intersectional competition, much as the Notre Dame–USC football rivalry. UCLA and Notre Dame played 42 times between 1966 and 1995, and the height of the rivalry was when Notre Dame ended UCLA's consecutive game winning streak at 88 on January 19, 1974. UCLA also broke a 60-game Notre Dame winning streak in South Bend.

Former UCLA head coach Ben Howland had since scheduled Notre Dame four times: in 2004, 2005, 2008, and 2009. Through the 2019-20 season, UCLA leads the all-time series 29–21.

Game results

References 

 Notre Dame Media Guide, pp. 184–185

College basketball rivalries in the United States
UCLA Bruins men's basketball
Notre Dame Fighting Irish basketball